Albuquerque Academy is an independent, co-educational day school for grades 6-12 located in Albuquerque, New Mexico, United States. It is accredited by the Independent Schools Association of the Southwest and the New Mexico State Department of Education. Albuquerque Academy is also a member of the National Association of Independent Schools. It has routinely ranked among the Top 150 private high schools in the United States, peaking at #5 in 2015. It is not to be confused with Albuquerque High School, the first high school established in Albuquerque, which was originally named Albuquerque Academy. Albuquerque Academy comprises three different divisions: the 6-7 division, the 8-9 division, and the 10-12 division.

History
Albuquerque Academy was founded in 1955 as The Academy for Boys in the basement of a small Albuquerque church by William B. S. Wilburn. The school was eventually moved into a facility that is today used by Sandia Preparatory School. In 1965, the school moved to its current site in northeast Albuquerque.

Between 1957 and 1964, the Academy received a large tract of undeveloped land north of Albuquerque, part of the Elena Gallegos Land Grant, from the Albert G. Simms family.  The western portion (from Wyoming Boulevard to the Rio Grande) was sold to finance the creation of the current campus and the first endowment fund, and the present campus was created in the middle of the tract. The land east of the campus, reaching to the crest of the Sandia Mountains, was sold later in a series of deals.  First the section from the campus to Juan Tabo Boulevard was sold to create a second trust.  Later, the City of Albuquerque attempted to facilitate a deal to sell the remainder to the Bureau of Land Management by putting up a parking garage as collateral.  The deal fell through and the Academy became the garage owner while still retaining the area.

In July 1982, the city purchased most of the land in a complex deal with the Academy and the US Forest Service. The City paid the Academy $23.9 million, raised by a bond issue supported by a temporary ¼ percent sales tax. The City retained part of the land, which is now the  Elena Gallegos Picnic Area/Albert G. Simms Park, located at the feet of the Sandias at the mouths of Bear and Pino Canyons. The  plus remainder of the purchase, most of it forest land in the canyons proper, was sold to the Forest Service, and is now part of the Cibola National Forest and the Sandia Mountain Wilderness. The Academy retained two parts of the tract, the larger adjoining Tramway Boulevard. The school set up the High Desert Investment Corporation (HDIC) to develop this portion as the master-planned community known as High Desert. (The smaller portion, within Bear Canyon itself, is still used by the Academy for experiential education purposes.) HDIC then purchased a large tract of land in the northern section of Rio Rancho, developed as Mariposa. The proceeds from the land sales and from HDIC have provided the Academy with a substantial endowment, which is used partly to defray tuition expenses and to subsidize a significant need-based financial aid program. HDIC has since been dissolved.

The school remained an all-boys school, with grades five through 12, until 1973, at which time girls were allowed into grades nine through 12. Part of the reason for the delay in allowing girls and for the gradual inclusion was that the Simms grant specified that the number of boys not decrease in order to make room for girls. The fifth grade was dropped in 1979, and the school became fully coeducational in 1984.

Today, the Academy has an enrollment of more than 1,100 in grades 6 through 12, with students drawn from throughout the Albuquerque metropolitan area and the state of New Mexico.

Heads of school
 
 William B. S. Wilburn, 1955–60
 Rev. Paul G. Saunders, 1960–64
 Ashby Harper, 1964–85
 Robert L. Bovinette, 1985–96
 Timothy R. McIntire, 1996–99
 Donald W. Smith (interim head), 1999–2001
 Andrew T. Watson, 2001–2020
 Julianne Puente (head-of-school), 2020–present

Facilities
The school sits on an approximately 312-acre (1.5 km2) gated campus in the northeastern part of the city. It is divided into two campuses, the West Campus and the East Campus. The two campuses are separated by about a quarter of a mile, with the library, science building, and athletic fields in between. The school buildings conform to a consistent Mediterranean-influenced architectural style, which incorporates brick buildings, arches, and tile roofs.

West Campus
The West Campus consists of eight buildings, including sixth- and seventh-grade classroom buildings, an administration building, a dining hall, and a gymnasium. In addition, the Visual Arts building and Natatorium are on the West Campus. All of the buildings except the Natatorium were designed by Robert McCabe of Flatow, Moore, Bryan, and Associates, and opened in 1984. The Natatorium was added to the West Campus Gymnasium in 1997.

Simms Library

The Dr. Albert G. Simms II and Barbara Young Simms Library (almost always shortened to "Simms Library") is the Academy's most iconic building, housing the school's collection of more than 140,000 books, periodicals, videos, and recordings. It has two wings that open onto a central lobby, with the fiction/nonfiction section housed in the larger north wing and reference materials in the east wing. The library was designed by Alexander "Sandy" Howe of the Boston firm of Shepley, Bulfinch, Richardson and Abbott and opened in 1991 along with the Science Building. The Library spire is the highest point on campus. The Head of School’s office is also located in the library.

Science Building
The Science Building sits across a brick plaza from the Library. It houses the majority of the Academy's science classrooms, labs, and faculty, as well as some teachers from other departments. The building is made up of two classroom wings and two laboratory wings grouped around a square central courtyard, which includes a small pond, containing some small fish and aquatic pond snails. The main foyer houses a large Foucault pendulum. (Another smaller pendulum is located in Brown Hall on the East Campus). The Science Building was also designed by Howe and opened at the same time as the Library. It is adjacent to the Desert Oasis Teaching (DOT) Gardens, a resource that serves students and the community.

East Campus 
The East Campus currently is home to grades 8-12. It includes the Academy's four original buildings, all grouped around a central quad: McKinnon Hall (formerly North Hall, the 8-9 classroom building), Brown Hall (the 10-12 classroom building), the Administration Building, and the gymnasium-dining hall complex. All were designed by Edward O. Holien of Holien and Buckley and completed in 1965. Also on the East Campus is the Simms Center for the Performing Arts, designed by George Pearl, completed in 1975, and remodeled in 2000; and the Music Building, designed by Bill Sabatini of Dekker/Perich/Sabatini and completed in 1996.

Athletic facilities
The Academy's largest sports facilities are the Athletic Field (used for football and soccer games and track and field meets), the East Campus Gym (basketball and volleyball), and the Natatorium (swimming and diving). There are also several soccer, baseball, and softball fields, a 16-court tennis complex, a cross country course, a weight room, and basketball courts. The Experiential Education department also constructed a pump (bicycle) track used by the summer program, PE classes, and Ex Ed students on the east end of campus.

Experiential education
The Academy curriculum includes a significant experiential education component, part of which involves outdoor activities such as backpacking, rock climbing, and canoeing. The school's 270-acre (1.1 km2) tract in Bear Canyon is used for this purpose; trips also take place in areas throughout the state. The sixth-grade students take an overnight trip in Bear Canyon and go on day trips. The seventh graders go to Bear Canyon for four days and three nights. The eight graders go on a half-week retreat together at the beginning of the year, and the ninth graders go on small-group remote backpacking trips in a regional wilderness area. The 10-12 students may take classes in outdoor leadership as well as kayaking, climbing, and mountain biking.

Student body
The school is roughly half boys and half girls, and more than one half of the students self-identify as students of color or multicultural. The Academy also ranks among the top independent secondary schools with regard to need-based financial aid offered to students, totaling nearly one-quarter of the student body and $4.6 million.

Albuquerque Academy prides itself on its 7:1 student/teacher ratio.

Thirteen members of the Class of 2022 were recognized as National Merit Semifinalists, and the class earned an average ACT score of 30.1, nearly ten points above the national average. Individual honors for the senior class included a U.S. Presidential Scholarship recipient.

Tuition
The board of trustees sets tuition for each school year. While the current cost per student stands at approximately $35,000 per year, the endowment allows for a tuition cost of $26,176 including lunch fees. Book expenses range average $250-$500 per year depending on grade level. Financial aid is awarded based on a family's demonstrated need and the student's strengths relative to the applicant's class. In spring of 2018 a group of parents petitioned the school for an audit of the school’s finances, citing the school allegedly squandering 42 million dollars between 2011 and 2016, nearly a third of the school's endowment. The parents cited a concern for students who attend the school by virtue of need-based financial aid.

Extracurricular activities
Extracurricular activities at the school include state championship sports teams, The Advocate (a student newsmagazine that has received numerous awards from the Albuquerque Tribune and the New Mexico Press Women), Science Olympiad, Science Bowl, and theater.

The four longest sports state championship streaks by Academy sports teams are the six-peat boys basketball team (1989–1994), the 17-time defending state champion boys tennis team (2003–present), the six-time state champion boys swim team (2006-2011), and the six-time state champion boys track team (2002–2007).

The swim teams have won 40 combined titles (21 for the boys, 19 for the girls).

The school's mock trial team won the 2012 National High School Mock Trial Championship in May 2012, marking the first time a New Mexican team had won the title, and the first time a team from the host state had won. In 2013, the team won the national championship again, which was only the third time in tournament history that a school won twice in a row. The program has qualified at least one team for state competition every year since the program was rebooted in 2005. The 2016, the team finished 4th in the National competition held in Boise, ID. In 2019, Academy's mock trial team placed sixth at the National High School Mock Trial Championship. In 2021, Academy's mock trial team placed third at the National High School Mock Trial Championship. And in 2022 the team placed seventh in the nation as well.

In May 2010, the school's team won the US DOE Middle School Science Bowl competition in Washington, DC.

Previous Academy Science Bowl teams had finished second (in 2006) and fourth (in 2009). The middle school science bowl team most recently represented New Mexico at nationals in 2019.

Speech and Debate is offered as an extracurricular activity at Albuquerque Academy. At the 2009 New Mexico State Speech and Debate Tournament, Albuquerque Academy won Speech Sweepstakes, Debate Sweepstakes, and Debate Coach of the Year and had five state champions. The Speech and Debate team had held the state title for 24 straight years by 2010 (winning Speech Sweepstakes and Debate Sweepstakes and having many state champions). At the 2014 New Mexico State Speech and Debate Tournament, the Albuquerque Academy Speech and Debate team reclaimed the title by winning the Speech Sweepstakes and Debate Sweepstakes and having seven state champions. In 2019, 16 members of the team qualified for nationals, and the Academy was named Overall School of Excellence.

In the spring of 2006, the orchestra, the Chamber Players, was invited to attend the National Orchestra Festival in Kansas City, Missouri, where they received a superior rating.

Sports State Championships

The Academy has won a number of state championships.

{| class="wikitable collapsible collapsed"
|+
!colspan=4 align=center bgcolor=""|Table of State Championships
|-
! width="25"|Season !! Sport !! width="55";align="center"|Number of Championships !!width="150";align="center"|Year
|-
| rowspan="6"| Fall || Football || align="center"|0 ||
|-
| Boys' Cross Country  || align="center"|15 || 1995, 1998, 1999, 2000, 2001, 2002, 2004, 2005, 2006, 2008, 2009, 2010, 2015, 2016, 2017
|-
| Girls' Cross Country || align="center"|6 || 1993, 2005, 2008, 2016, 2017, 2018
|-
| Boys' Soccer || align="center"|7 || 1984, 1999, 2000, 2001, 2015, 2016, 2018, 2020 (in 2021), 2021
|-
| Girls' Soccer|| align="center"|9 || 2000, 2001, 2002, 2008, 2009, 2010, 2011, 2012, 2018
|-
| Volleyball|| align="center"|1 || 1998, 2020 (in 2021)
|-
| rowspan="5"|Winter || Boys' Basketball|| align="center"|9 ||1968, 1981, 1984, 1989, 1990, 1991, 1992, 1993, 1994
|-
| Girls' Basketball || align="center"|0 ||
|-
| Boys' Swimming || align="center"|24 || 1972, 1973, 1975, 1985, 1986, 1989, 1992, 1994, 1995, 1997, 1999, 2000, 2001, 2002, 2003, 2006, 2007, 2008, 2009, 2010, 2011, 2015, 2016, 2017
|-
| Girls' Swimming || align="center"|21 || 1986, 1987, 1989, 1990, 1991, 1994, 2000, 2003, 2004, 2005, 2006, 2007, 2009, 2010, 2011, 2012, 2015, 2016, 2017, 2018, 2019, 2020, 2021, 2022
|-
| Wrestling || align="center"|5 || 1969, 1977, 1978, 1979, 1983
|-
| rowspan="9"| Spring || Baseball  || align="center"|2 || 1999, 2009, 2015, 2021
|-
| Boys' Golf || align="center"|8 || 1975, 1990, 1997, 2003, 2008, 2009, 2014, 2015, 2021, 2022
|-
| Girls' Golf|| align="center"|3 || 1993, 1995, 2015, 2021, 2022
|-
| Softball|| align="center"|0 ||
|-
| Boys' Track|| align="center"|17 || 1991, 1996, 1999, 2002, 2003, 2004, 2005, 2006, 2007, 2009, 2010, 2012, 2015, 2016, 2017, 2018, 2019
|-
| Girls' Track|| align="center"|8 || 1993, 2002, 2005, 2006, 2007, 2008, 2018, 2019
|-
| Boys' Tennis|| align="center"|23 || 1993, 1995, 1998, 1999, 2000, 2001, 2003, 2004, 2005, 2006, 2007, 2008, 2009, 2010, 2011, 2012, 2013, 2014, 2015, 2016, 2017, 2018, 2019, 2021, 2022
|-
| Girls' Tennis|| align="center"|9 || 1994, 1995, 1996, 1997, 1998, 2005, 2006, 2016, 2019, 2021, 2022
|-
| colspan="2" align="center"|Total || align="center"|189|| Totals current through Spring 2022
|}

Notable alumni

 Kyle Altman (born 1986), soccer player
 Anika Apostalon, professional swimmer
 Norman Bay, former US Attorney and former head of the FERC Office of Enforcement
 Curtis Beach (born 1990), decathlete
 Notah Begay III, professional golfer
 James Borrego, NBA basketball coach  
 R. Martin Chavez, investment banker
 Brian Conrey, mathematician
 David Eagleman (born 1971), writer and neuroscientist
 Kate Gallego, mayor of Phoenix
 Mira Jacob, novelist
 Amy Loyd, U.S. Department of Education Assistant Secretary 
 Victor Milán (class of 1972), science fiction writer
 Joshua Cooper Ramo, journalist and businessman
 Cody Toppert, basketball player and coach
 Chainey Umphrey, Olympic gymnast

References

External links
 Albuquerque Academy website
 Quick facts on the school

Independent Schools Association of the Southwest
Preparatory schools in New Mexico
High schools in Albuquerque, New Mexico
Private middle schools in New Mexico
Private high schools in New Mexico
1955 establishments in New Mexico
Educational institutions established in 1955